Vukan I (1050 – 1112) was the Grand Prince of Serbia from 1083 until his death in 1112. During first years he ruled together with his brother Marko, holding the regions of inner Serbia (Raška, lat. Rascia). With the death of his cousin, king Constantine Bodin of Duklja in 1101, he became the most powerful ruler among Serbian princes. He defeated the Byzantines several times, conquering parts of northern Macedonia. He is the eponymous founder of the Vukanović dynasty.

Biography
Vukan was the first-born of Petrislav, the son of King Mihailo I and his second Greek wife. He and his brother Marko swore an oath of loyalty to Constantine Bodin and took power as his vassals in Serbia in 1083 or 1084. Marko later disappears from sources. Neither Bosnia, Zachlumia nor Raška were ever permanently integrated into the Kingdom of Duklja. Each region had its own nobility and institutions and acquired a Vojislavljević to head as Župan.

In 1089, Bodin managed to raise the bishopric of Bar to an Archbishopric, by supporting the pope against an antipope. The suffragan bishops were to be: Kotor, Ulcinj, Svac, Skadar, Drivast, Pula, Ras, Bosnia and Trebinje. In obtaining its promotion, it acquired a much larger diocese, including territory that earlier had not been under the pope – territories of the metropolitan of Durazzo and Archbishop of Ochrid, two sees that recognized the jurisdiction of the Ecumenical Patriarchate of Constantinople. The Bar Archbishopric's new territory were merely theoretical – the pope's edict could only affect the churches that recognized Rome. Making Serbia a suffragan to Bar had little meaning, as most of its churches were under Constantinople, and there is no evidence of Vukan changing adherence to Rome. Durazzo and Ochrid may have suffered minimal territorial losses along the coast, Duklja was briefly a subject to Rome, however inland Duklja was not affected, and along with much of Duklja's coast (like most of Kotor) was to retain its loyalty to Orthodoxy.

A Byzantine campaign was launched against Duklja between 1089 and 1091, possibly managing to take Bodin captive for a second time. Civil war broke out in the realm among Bodin's relatives, greatly weakening Duklja, giving the chance for inner Serbia (Raška) to assert itself and break away. Vukan asserts independence, as well as Bosnia and Zahumlje. Up to this point, Duklja had been the center of the Serbian realm, as well as the main resistance to Byzantium in the Balkans. Inner Serbia became the most powerful of Serbian states, remaining so throughout the Middle Ages. Inner Serbia (Raška) gradually replaced Duklja as the main opponent of Byzantine rule in the 12th century. Bodin's heirs were forced to recognize Byzantine overlordship, and had now only the small territory of Duklja and Travunia.

In 1091 or 1092, Vukan became independent, taking the title of Grand Prince (Veliki Župan). His state was centered on present-day Novi Pazar. Subordinate to him were local dukes (Župan, holding a territory equivalent of a county), who seem to have been more or less autonomous in the internal affairs of their counties, but who were obliged to be loyal to Vukan, and supporting him in battle. It seems that the dukes were hereditary holders of their counties, holding their land before Duklja annexed inner Serbia (Raška).

In about 1090, Vukan began raiding Byzantine territory, first in the vicinity of Kosovo. Initially the Byzantines were unable to take steps against Vukan, as they faced a serious threat in the invading Pechenegs. On 29 April 1091, the Byzantines destroyed the Pecheneg force. With the defeat of the Pechenegs, Alexios I Komnenos could now turn to the Serbs.

Alexios I first sent an army with the strategos of Durazzo, which was defeated by Vukan in 1092. The Emperor now mobilized a much larger army, led by himself, marching onto inner Serbia (Raška). Vukan sends envoys, seeking peace which Alexios I quickly accepted, as a new problem had arisen at home in the Cumans who plundered the lands as far as Adrianople. Immediately after the Emperor's departure, Vukan breaks the treaty, and began to expand along the Vardar, obtaining much booty and taking the cities of Vranje, Skopje and Tetovo. In 1094 or 1095, Alexios I marched out to meet the Serbs. Vukan and his dukes arrive at the Emperor's tent and offer peace, with his own son Uros I as hostage (throughout the 12th century it was usual for relatives of the Grand Prince to stay at the imperial court as hostages of peace).

At this time, Serbian principality was independent – Vukan acted entirely on his own, no longer a vassal of Duklja. Duklja, because of its civil war, did not involve itself in the Serbian-Byzantine wars.

Vukan again marched south, into Macedonia. Alexios could not do anything about him as the Crusade took place. In 1106 Vukan submitted to Alexios.

Following Bodin's death in 1101, Bodin's half-brother Dobroslav II succeeded him as king of Duklja. Kočopar Branislavljević, Bodin's first cousin once removed, travelled from Dyrrhachium to Raška, forging an alliance with Vukan. This alliance would prove worthy in their successful invasion of Duklja in 1102. The battle that ensued at the Morača led to the overthrow of Dobroslav II and the coronation of Kočopar to the throne. Dobroslav was subsequently banished to Raška. However, Kočopar's reign was short-lived as well as Vukan had been planning to install Bodin's nephew, Vladimir to the throne of Duklja. Kočopar, having lost influence among the Zachlumoi, married the daughter of a Zachlumian (Bosnian) prince (knez). However, in the Chronicle of the Priest of Duklja, the chronicler specifically mentioned that at the time, Zachlumia was ruled by a ban, not a knez. Kočopar later died in battle against the Zachlumoi. Upon his death, Vukan installed Bodin's nephew Vladimir as planned, to whom he gave his daughter as a wife and so strengthened ties between Raška and Duklja. A mere pawn in dynastic conflicts, Vladimir was poisoned in 1118 under orders from Queen Jaquinta, widow of his late uncle, Constantine Bodin. Jaquinta then appointed her son, George, to the throne of Duklja.

Upon spreading his influence in Duklja, Vukan invaded Byzantium once more in the spring of 1106. He was probably attempting to take advantage of the Norman campaign against the Byzantines (see Byzantine–Norman wars). In a battle, he defeated John II Komnenos again. The war was concluded by November of that year, with Vukan being forced to send hostages once again to emperor Alexios I in return for peace. There is no written record of Vukan after this war.

Scholars believe Vukan died after 1112. Vukan's successor was Uroš I his nephew through Marko.

Notes

References

Sources
Primary sources
 
 
 
 Anna Comnena, The Alexiad, translated by Elizabeth A. Dawes in 1928
 John Kinnamos, The Deeds of John and Manuel Comnenus, trans. C.M. Brand (New York, 1976). 

Secondary sources

 
 
 
 
 Imperii Graeci Historia, ed. Hieronymus Wolf, 1557, in Greek with parallel Latin translation. (PDF of 1593 reprint)
 
 

11th-century Serbian monarchs
12th-century Serbian monarchs
Vukanović dynasty
Eastern Orthodox monarchs
1050s births
1112 deaths
Christian monarchs